Chris Evert (February 14, 1971 – January 8, 2001) was an American Hall of Fame Champion Thoroughbred racehorse, winning the U.S. Filly Triple Crown in 1974 and earning the Eclipse Award for Outstanding 3-Year-Old Filly.

Background
Chris Evert was bred by Echo Valley Farm near Georgetown, Kentucky, owned by Donald & Shirley Sucher. The couple would later breed Winning Colors, another Hall of Fame filly and winner of the 1988 Kentucky Derby. Carl Rosen (1918–1983), owner of clothing manufacturer Puritan Fashions Corp., purchased the unnamed filly at a Keeneland yearling sale. He named her for the tennis player Chris Evert, whom he had signed to endorse his company's line of sportswear.

Racing career
Chris Evert began racing at age two. Of her five starts, she won four and finished second in the other. At age three she dominated her class, winning the U.S. Filly Triple Crown and earning the Eclipse Award for Outstanding 3-Year-Old Filly.

In 1974, Aaron Jones, the owner of the West Coast-based filly Miss Musket, issued a challenge to Chris Evert's owner for their horses to meet in a match race. Miss Musket's record included winning the Hollywood Oaks, and her confident owner offered to put up $100,000 if Chris Evert's owner would match it. Hollywood Park Racetrack offered another $150,000 to the winner-take-all race, which it would host and would bill as the Hollywood Special Stakes. Rosen accepted the offer for a match race to be held on July 20, 1974. Chris Evert won by 50 lengths, and the large purse significantly contributed to her becoming 1974's leading money earner in U.S. Thoroughbred racing.

At age four, Chris Evert won two more times but was retired early after competing in only four races. Rosen decided to use her as the foundation mare to establish his own horse breeding operation at Three Chimneys Farm in Midway, Kentucky.

Breeding record
As a broodmare, Chris Evert produced graded stakes race winners Wimbledon Star and the filly Six Crowns, who was sired by Secretariat. Six Crowns in turn produced Eclipse Award and Breeders' Cup Juvenile winner Chief's Crown. Pensioned in 1990, at age 30 Chris Evert was euthanized on January 8, 2001, due to the infirmities of old age. She was buried at Three Chimneys Farm's broodmare cemetery.

Honors
Chris Evert was inducted into the National Museum of Racing and Hall of Fame in 1988.

Pedigree

References

1971 racehorse births
2001 racehorse deaths
Racehorses bred in Kentucky
Racehorses trained in the United States
Eclipse Award winners
United States Thoroughbred Racing Hall of Fame inductees
Thoroughbred family 23-b
Chris Evert